As a candidate country of the European Union, Montenegro (ME) is included in the Nomenclature of Territorial Units for Statistics (NUTS). The three NUTS levels are:
 NUTS-1: ME0 Montenegro
 NUTS-2: ME00 Montenegro
 NUTS-3: ME000 Montenegro

Below the NUTS levels, there are two LAU levels (LAU-1: municipalities; LAU-2: settlements).

See also
 Subdivisions of Montenegro
 ISO 3166-2 codes of Montenegro

Sources
 Hierarchical list of the Nomenclature of territorial units for statistics - NUTS and the Statistical regions of Europe

Montenegro
Subdivisions of Montenegro